Mica is a commune in Cluj County, Transylvania, Romania. It is composed of seven villages: Dâmbu Mare (Nagydomb), Mănăstirea (Szentbenedek), Mica, Nireș (Szásznyíres), Sânmărghita (Szentmargita), Valea Cireșoii (Décseipataktanya) and Valea Luncii (Lunkatanya).

Mănăstirea village is the site of Kornis Castle.

Demographics 
According to the census from 2002 there was a total population of 3,836 people living in this commune. Of this population, 70.77% are ethnic Romanians, 28.12% are ethnic Hungarians and 0.06% ethnic Romani.

References

Communes in Cluj County
Localities in Transylvania